Wedding Season is an action comedy romantic thriller streaming television series created by Oliver Lyttelton for the Star content hub of Disney+.

Premise

A young man named Stefan objects at the wedding of Katie McConnell, with whom he has been having an affair at various weddings over the summer, only to be rejected. Hours later, Stefan is arrested and learns that Katie's new in-laws were poisoned at the reception and she has gone missing. Despite his suspicions of Katie, Stefan goes on the run with her to find out the truth.

Cast 
 Rosa Salazar as Katie
 Gavin Drea as Stefan
 George Webster as Hugo Delaney
 Jade Harrison as DCI Metts
 Jamie Michie as DI Donahue
 Callie Cooke as Leila
 Bhav Joshi as Anil
 Ioanna Kimbook as Suji
 Omar Baroud as Jackson
 Ivan Kaye as Mr. Delaney

Episodes

Production 
In late July 2021, Disney EMEA ordered the series from Jax Media and Dancing Ledge Productions with Rosa Salazar attached as the female lead. In November 2021, the series on boarded Gavin Drea as the male lead while Jamie Michie and Jade Harrison were added in supporting roles.

Release 
The series debuted on September 8, 2022 on Disney+'s Star wherever available, on Hulu in the United States and on Star+ in the Latin America.

Reception

Critical reception 
On the review aggregator website Rotten Tomatoes, the series holds a 74% approval rating, with an average rating of 6.6/10 based on 19 reviews. The critics consensus on the website states, "Wedding Seasons mashing of discordant genres can make for a less than perfect union, but nobody will object to the compelling chemistry between Gavin Drea and Rosa Salazar." Metacritic, which uses a weighted average, reported "generally favorable reviews" with an assigned score of 71 out of 100, based on reviews from 13 critics.

References

External links 
 
 

Action comedy television series
2022 British television series debuts
Star (Disney+) original programming
2020s British crime television series
2020s British black comedy television series
2020s British romantic comedy television series
British thriller television series
English-language television shows
Wedding television shows